On the Waterfront is a British children's television series that aired on BBC1 from 23 April 1988 to 8 July 1989. The programme aired on Saturday mornings and was filmed at Brunswick Dock, Liverpool. It consisted of comedy sketches interspersed with cartoons, competitions and music.

The writer Russell T Davies, later a BAFTA Award-winner for his work on programmes such as Queer as Folk and Doctor Who, worked on the series, writing the script for a comedy dubbed version of the French children's drama series The Flashing Blade.

The series is notable in giving the human and puppet double-act Bodger and Badger their first TV exposure.

Transmissions

References

External links
Summer Replacements at Saturday Mornings
On the Waterfront on Paul Morris' SatKids

1988 British television series debuts
1989 British television series endings
1980s British children's television series
BBC children's television shows
British children's television series